Jaynul Islam (born 1992) is a Bangladeshi cricketer. He made his List A debut for Partex Sporting Club in the 2016–17 Dhaka Premier Division Cricket League on 1 June 2017. He made his Twenty20 debut on 31 May 2021, for Partex Sporting Club in the 2021 Dhaka Premier Division Twenty20 Cricket League. He made his first-class debut on 21 November 2021, for Sylhet Division in the 2021–22 National Cricket League.

References

External links
 

1992 births
Living people
Bangladeshi cricketers
Partex Sporting Club cricketers
Sylhet Division cricketers
Place of birth missing (living people)